Michael Einar Olsson (born 4 March 1986) is a Swedish cyclist.

Major results

2010
 2nd Univest Grand Prix
 3rd Road race, National Road Championships
2011
 4th Scandinavian Race Uppsala
 7th GP Herning
2012
 1st Stage 1 (ITT) Tour de Normandie
 2nd Scandinavian Race Uppsala
 6th Tartu GP
2013
 1st  Road race, National Road Championships
 2nd Ringerike GP
 4th Scandinavian Race Uppsala
 7th Hadeland GP
 9th Overall Tour de Normandie
2014
 1st  Road race, National Road Championships
 3rd Hadeland GP
 6th Ringerike GP
 7th Overall Istrian Spring Trophy
 8th Overall Sibiu Cycling Tour
 8th Skive–Løbet
2015
 3rd Overall Tour des Fjords
 5th Overall Flèche du Sud
 7th Philadelphia International Cycling Classic
 8th GP Viborg
 8th Ringerike GP
 9th Hadeland GP

References

External links

1986 births
Living people
Swedish male cyclists
Sportspeople from Gothenburg
20th-century Swedish people
21st-century Swedish people